The Lieut. Thomas Fuller House is a historic First Period house in Middleton, Massachusetts.  The oldest portion of the house, two stories of rooms either side of a central chimney, was built c. 1684 by Thomas Fuller.  By 1690 a leanto section (which may have surviving elements still in the house) was added to the house.  The leanto was raised to a full second story in the 19th century.  Later shed roofed additions extend further off the back of the house, and a small gabled addition extends over the eastern end of the leanto section.

The house was listed on the National Register of Historic Places in 1990.

See also
National Register of Historic Places listings in Essex County, Massachusetts

References

Houses completed in 1684
Houses in Middleton, Massachusetts
Houses on the National Register of Historic Places in Essex County, Massachusetts
1684 establishments in Massachusetts